2-Methylbenzaldehyde is an organic compound with the formula CH3C6H4CHO.  It is a colorless liquid.

Use and occurrence
Of its many reactions, 2-methylbenzaldehyde undergoes BF3-induced Rothemund condensation with pyrrole to give atropoisomers of tetrakis(o-tolyl)porphyrin.

It is one of main benzaldehyde component of automobile exhaust.

Related compounds
 Benzaldehyde
 4-Methylbenzaldehyde
 Salicylaldehyde

References

Benzaldehydes